Peter Hobday (born 9 April 1961) is an English former professional footballer, active primarily in Germany, who played as a midfielder.

Career
Born in London, Hobday played in England for Gillingham, and in Germany for TuS Schloß Neuhaus, Stuttgarter Kickers, Hannover 96, Eintracht Frankfurt, TuS Paderborn-Neuhaus, Arminia Bielefeld, Rot-Weiss Essen and LR Ahlen.

References

1961 births
Living people
Footballers from Greater London
English expatriate sportspeople in Germany
English footballers
Gillingham F.C. players
SC Paderborn 07 players
Stuttgarter Kickers players
Hannover 96 players
Eintracht Frankfurt players
Arminia Bielefeld players
Rot-Weiss Essen players
Rot Weiss Ahlen players
Bundesliga players
2. Bundesliga players
Association football midfielders
English expatriate footballers
Expatriate footballers in Germany